Arrêtez-moi (Stop Me) is a 2013 French thriller film directed by Jean-Paul Lilienfeld and starring Sophie Marceau, Miou-Miou, and Marc Barbé. Written by Jean-Paul Lilienfeld and Jean Teulé, the film is about a woman who shows up at a police station and confesses to the murder of her abusive husband several years earlier. The female police officer who interviews her cannot understand why this woman who was never a suspect has come forward after all this time. The more she learns about the woman's life, the less she wants to arrest her. Arrêtez-moi was released on 6 February 2013 in France.

Cast

 Sophie Marceau as La coupable
 Miou-Miou as Pontoise
 Marc Barbé as Jimmy
 Yann Ebonge as Joliveau
 Valérie Bodson as Madeleine
 Julie Maes as Brigitte
 Arthur Buyssens as Cédric (17 ans)
 Vadim Goudsmits as Cédric (7 ans)
 Thomas Coumans as Pontoise's friend
 Eric Godon as The guardian

Production

Arrêtez-moi was filmed on location in Dunkirk, France.

Reception

Accolades
The film received a Lumières Award nomination for Best Original or Adapted Screenplay (Jean-Paul Lilienfeld).

References

External links

 
 

2013 films
French crime thriller films
2010s French-language films
2013 crime thriller films
Films set in France
Films shot in France
2010s French films